Team Skyline is a professional men's cycling team based in the United States. The team started competing in 2013 as an amateur team, before starting competition in elite road bicycle racing events as a UCI Continental team in 2019. As of 2023, Team Skyline is one of America's longest running continental programs.

The team supports the non-profit, Winning the Race with Diabetes and promotes its mission and vision to inspire, teach, and demonstrate how to fully manage Type 1 Diabetes, thereby reducing its long-term health risks through a highly active and athletically competitive lifestyle.

Team roster
The goal for Team Skyline in 2023 is to support primarily North American talent by ensuring these riders have access to the biggest races on the continent and to opportunities to experience European racing and cycling culture.

References

External links

Cycling teams based in the United States
Cycling teams established in 2013